Flickan vid stenbänken is a Swedish 1989 TV series in nine episodes directed by Marianne Ahrne starring Anna Edlund, Anna Björk and Lena T. Hansson. The series was based on Maria Gripe's books Skuggan över stenbänken (1982), ...och de vita skuggorna i skogen (1984) and Skuggornas barn (1986).

Cast 
Anna Björk as Berta 
Anna Edlund as Carolin 
Lena T. Hansson as Mother
Bertil Lundén as Father 
Magnus Sagrén as Roland 
Frida Hesselgren as Nadja 
Majlis Granlund as Svea
Inga Landgré as Grandmother
Gerhard Hoberstorfer as Arild 
Gaëlle Legrand as Rosilda
Viveca Lindfors as Storråda 
Anita Björk as Amalia 
Hans Polster as Axel 
Chatarina Larsson as Vera 
Marika Lindström as Sofia  
Georg Årlin as the coachman

External links 

Swedish children's television series
1980s Swedish television series